Hemendra Chandra Singh (29 September 1967 – 5 September 2014) was an Indian politician. He was elected to the 16th Lok Sabha in 2014 from Kandhamal constituency in Odisha.
He was a member of the Biju Janata Dal (BJD) political party. He had left Congress and joined BJD in February 2014.

Born in the royal family of Nayagarh, Hemendra was the Second Child of Late Maharaja B.K.Singh & Maharani Lokrajaya. His elder brother was Gajendra Chandra Singh. Hemendra Chandra Singh a lok sabha candidate from Biju Janta Dal, from Kandhamal District Odisha, contested the 16th Lok Sabha General elections and won with a margin of 181017 (One Lakh Eighty One Thousand and Seventeen) votes from his nearest rival Shri Harihar Karan of Indian National congress.

He died on 5 September 2014 at Bhubaneswar,
while undergoing treatment for myocardial infarction and sepsis.

See also
 Indian general election, 2014 (Odisha)

References

External links
 Info at MyNeta

1967 births
2014 deaths
Lok Sabha members from Odisha
India MPs 2014–2019
People from Nayagarh district
People from Kandhamal district
Indian National Congress politicians
Biju Janata Dal politicians